Victoria Larrière (born 2 May 1991) is a French former professional tennis player. As of 14 May 2012, she reached her highest singles ranking of world No. 172.

Career
Her career accelerated in the summer of 2011 when she won her first final in a $50k tournament in Istanbul.
The following week, for her first appearance in a WTA Tour tournament at the 2011 Tashkent Open, she qualified into the main draw. After winning over Zuzana Kučová  in the first round, she played and beat her first top 100, seed No. 5 Magdaléna Rybáriková (6–4, 6–4) for a total of ten successive wins. She lost in the quarterfinal against Ksenia Pervak, seed No. 1 and eventual winner of the tournament, in straight sets.

Larrière lost in the first round of the doubles main-draw at the 2011 French Open.

Victoria was close to qualify for the 2012 Australian Open, leading 6–4, 3–1 in the last qualification round, but lost 6–4, 4–6, 3–6 to Chang Kai-chen. She was awarded a wildcard for the main draw of the 2012 French Open but lost in the first round to the 16th seed Maria Kirilenko, in two sets.

ITF Circuit finals

Singles: 15 (10 titles, 5 runner-ups)

Doubles: 12 (10 titles, 2 runner-ups)

External links
 
 

1991 births
Living people
French female tennis players